Dầu Giây is a township and capital of Thống Nhất District, Đồng Nai Province, Vietnam.

References

Populated places in Đồng Nai province
District capitals in Vietnam
Communes of Đồng Nai province
Townships in Vietnam